Nana is a 1926 French silent drama film directed by Jean Renoir and starring Catherine Hessling, Werner Krauss and Jean Angelo. It was Renoir's second full-length film and is based on the 1880 novel by Émile Zola.

It was shot at the Bavaria Studios in Munich and the Neuilly Studios in Paris. The film's sets were designed by the art director Claude Autant-Lara.

Plot
A government official, Count Muffat, falls under the spell of Nana, a young actress. She becomes his mistress, living in the sumptuous apartment which he provides for her. Instead of elevating herself to Muffat's level, however, Nana drags the poor man down to hers - in the end, both lives have been utterly destroyed.

Production
The film stars Renoir's wife, Catherine Hessling, in an eccentric performance as the flawed heroine Nana.

Jean Renoir's film is a fairly faithful adaptation of Émile Zola's classic novel.  The film's extravagances include two magnificent set pieces – a horse race and an open air ball.  The film never made a profit, and the commercial failure of the film robbed Renoir of the opportunity to make such an ambitious film again for several years.

Cast
 Catherine Hessling as Nana 	 	
 Werner Krauss as Count Muffat
 Jean Angelo as Count de Vandeuvres
 Raymond Guérin-Catelain as Georges Hugon
 Pierre Lestringuez as Bordenave 
 Jacqueline Forzane as La Comtesse Sabine Muffat 
 Claude Autant-Lara as Fauchery 
 Pierre Champagne as Hector de la Faloise 
 Karl Harbacher as Francis - le coiffeur 
 Valeska Gert as Zoe - la femme de chambre 
 Jacqueline Ford as Rose Mignon 
 Dennis Price as Le jockey de 'Nana' 
 Gresham as Le jockey de 'Lusignan' 
 Luc Dartagnan as Maréchal - le bookmaker 
 Nita Romani as Satin 
 Roberto Pla as Bosc
 Gorieux as Le médecin

References 
 Nana at filmsdefrance

External links
 
Nana at Internet Archive
 Entry at Allmovie

1926 films
1920s French-language films
Films directed by Jean Renoir
French black-and-white films
French silent feature films
Films based on works by Émile Zola
French historical drama films
1920s historical drama films
Films set in the 19th century
Films shot at Bavaria Studios
1926 drama films
Silent drama films
1920s French films